Reswehera Rajamaha Vihara is an ancient temple which was built by the king Devanampiya Tissa (307BC-267BC) situated in North Western Province in Sri Lanka.

The temple is well known for its two Gautama Buddha statues, one carved in a rock and the other inside the vihara. In addition, the Bo tree which was planted from a branch of the sacred Jaya Sri Maha Bodhi illuminates the historical value of the place.

References

Buddhist temples in North Western Province, Sri Lanka
Archaeological protected monuments in Kurunegala District